Elmer Lee Fields (born April 26, 1950, in Wilson, North Carolina) is an American soul singer, sometimes nicknamed "Little JB" for his physical and vocal resemblance with James Brown. He has worked with Kool and the Gang, Hip Huggers, O.V. Wright, Darrell Banks, and Little Royal. Fields has also worked with musicians such as  B.B. King, Clarence Carter, Dr. John, Tyrone Davis, Johnny Taylor, Denise LaSalle, Bobby Blue Bland, Betty Wright, The Manhattans, Little Milton and Bobby Womack. He recorded his first single in 1969 and is still active. His recent work is with The Expressions, including the albums Faithful Man (2012), Special Night (2017), and It Rains Love (2019).

In 2014, he provided additional vocals for the James Brown biographical movie, Get On Up.

Early life
Fields was born in Wilson, North Carolina, United States, the son of Emma Jean Fields and John Fields. He was the second child of six children.

Fields had an interest in music from an early age. He decided to go to New York, at the age of 17 to pursue a music career. Although his mother (whom he later named an album in honor of) tried to convince him not to go, she ended up giving him her last 20 dollars. With moves and style inspired by James Brown, Fields soon had the nickname "Little JB". He moved to Plainfield, New Jersey at the time of his marriage, in his late teens.

Career

Early career (1969–1981)
In 1969, Fields released his first single on the Bedford label, "Bewildered" b/w "Tell Her I Love Her". He recorded "Gonna Make Love" on London Records in 1973. That same year, Fields released the popular single, "Let's Talk It Over" b/w "She's a Love Maker". Fields released "Everybody Gonna Give Their Thing Away to Somebody (Sometime)" b/w "East Coast Rapper,"  on SoundPlus in 1975. Most of the second half of the 1970s Fields spent cutting singles for Angle 3 Records, including  "The Bull Is Coming" b/w "Funky Screw". In 1979 he released a full-length album with Angle 3 called Let's Talk It Over.

In the 1980s, disco became increasingly popular, at the expense of soul. Venues that had previously booked Fields now booked DJs instead. Fields moved into real estate in Newark, New Jersey, in order to provide for his family.

Blues and dance music (1990s–2008)
In the 1990s, Fields returned singing soul-blues  on the Southern circuit. He signed with Mississippi-based Ace Records and debuted Enough Is Enough. On Ace, Fields released Coming to Tear the Roof Down  in 1995 and Dreaming Big Time in 1996 in which he played keyboards and synthesizers.

Later that year Fields signed to Desco Records founded by Gabriel Roth and Phillip Lehman. Sharon Jones, who was signed to Desco also at that time, sang backup for Fields on an early single. Fields was featured on the debut album  Gimmie the Paw by the label's band The Soul Providers in 1997. Desco later split into Daptone Records and Soul Fire, and Fields eventually recorded for them both. "Give Me a Chance" and "Shot Down" were two 7" singles he released on Daptone over 2001-2002 and in late 2002, the album Problems, on Soul Fire. In early 2005 he performed on "Stranded In Your Love" included on Sharon Jones & the Dap-Kings’ Naturally' LP. Another duet, "Will You Be True", was included on the 2014 remaster of Sharon Jones and The Dap-Kings' debut album, Dap Dippin' with Sharon Jones and the Dap-Kings.

In 2006 French House DJ Martin Solveig approached him to do a dance track. They toured in France and recorded the songs  "Jealousy", "Everybody", "I'm a Good Man", and "I Want You".

The Expressions (2009–present)
Truth and Soul Records recorded a single with Fields that later became "Honey Dove".  Lee Fields & The Expressions released "My World" for Truth and Soul in 2009. In 2011 he followed up with the album titled Treacherous. After releasing Faithful Man in 2012 with Truth and Soul, the singer toured globally. He then released two albums Emma Jean in 2014 and Special Night in 2017 (on Big Crown Records by former Truth and Soul co-founder Leon Michels).

In January 2019, Lee Fields & The Expressions released their latest single, "It Rains Love". Fields released an album, also entitled It Rains Love, in April 2019.In popular culture
Fields' songs have frequently been sampled by R&B and hip hop artists such as J. Cole, Slum Village, Travie McCoy and Travis Scott sampled the track "All I Need" from the album Emma Jean on his song "Antidote".

He has lent his vocals, writing skills and been the featured artist on albums of such artists like El Michels Affair, Kraak & Smaak, Bliss n Eso and Wax Tailor.

Fields' music can be found on various movies, TV shows and video games. In 2008 he performed "You Don't Know What You Mean (To a Love Like Me)" for the soundtrack of the movie Soul Men. Fields's track "Honey Dove" was featured during Law & Order: Special Victims Units thirteenth season in 2011 (Episode 10, "Spiraling Down"). The track "Honey Dove" was featured in Season 6 of American Dad in 2011 (Episode 12, "You Debt Your Life"). In 2014, Fields provided additional vocals for the James Brown biographical movie, Get On Up. The song "Ladies" was played in the movie Magic Mike XXL in 2015. In 2016, the song "Could Have Been" was featured on the TV series Atlanta, he was featured as the musical guest on CBS This Morning, and the song "I'll Be Around" was on the soundtrack of the movie Keeping Up With the Joneses. A brief excerpt of "It Rains Love" can be heard during the end titles of the 2020 BBC series Trigonometry. In 2023, the song "Forever" was featured in highest rated Super Bowl LVII commercial, also titled "Forever," for the dog food company The Farmer's Dog.

Personal life
Fields and his wife Christine are the parents of four adult children. They reside in Plainfield, New Jersey.

Discography
Let's Talk It Over (1979)

Problems (2002)
Lee Fields and The Expressions released the album Problems in 2002 with Truth and Soul Records.

My World (2009) My World is an album released in 2009 with Truth and Soul Records, in collaboration with the group The Expressions.

Faithful Man (2012)
Lee Fields released the album Faithful Man in 2012 with Truth and Soul Records.

Emma Jean (2014)
Lee Fields released the album Emma Jean in 2014 with Truth and Soul Records.

Special Night (2017)
Lee Fields and The Expressions released the album Special Night in 2017 with Big Crown Records.

It Rains Love (2019)
Lee Fields and The Expressions released the album It Rains Love in 2019 with Big Crown Records.

Sentimental Fool (2022)
Lee Fields released the album Sentimental Fool'' in 2022 with Daptone Records.

References

External links
 
 A feature with an interview at Soul Express
 Lee Fields tells about his album, "Sentimental Fool", in Soul Express

1951 births
Living people
American soul singers
American rhythm and blues singer-songwriters
African-American songwriters
20th-century African-American male singers
American blues singers
Singer-songwriters from North Carolina
Singer-songwriters from New Jersey
People from Plainfield, New Jersey
Daptone Records artists
Ace Records (United States) artists
21st-century African-American people
American male singer-songwriters